Leonard Peter Dondero (September 12, 1903 – January 1, 1999) was a Major League Baseball third baseman and second baseman who played with the St. Louis Browns in .

External links

1903 births
1999 deaths
Major League Baseball third basemen
Major League Baseball second basemen
Baseball players from California
Saint Mary's Gaels baseball players
St. Louis Browns players
People from Newark, California